Péter Tatai (born 23 June 1983) is a Hungarian handball goalkeeper who plays for Csurgói KK. He is a former Hungarian international.

Achievements
Nemzeti Bajnokság I:
Winner: 2006, 2008
Silver Medalist: 2007, 2011, 2012, 2013, 2014
Magyar Kupa
Winner: 2007
Finalist: 2006, 2008, 2012, 2013, 2014
Romanian National League:
Winner: 2015
Romanian Cup:
Winner: 2015
EHF Cup Winners' Cup:
Winner: 2008
EHF Cup:
Winner: 2014
EHF Champions League:
Semifinalist: 2006
EHF Champions Trophy:
Finalist: 2008

References

External links
 Péter Tatai career statistics on Worldhandball.com
 

1983 births
Living people
Sportspeople from Győr
Hungarian male handball players
Expatriate handball players
Hungarian expatriate sportspeople in France
Hungarian expatriate sportspeople in Romania
Hungarian expatriate sportspeople in Germany
TuS Nettelstedt-Lübbecke players